GLFW (Graphics Library Framework) is a lightweight utility library for use with OpenGL. It provides programmers with the ability to create and manage windows and OpenGL contexts, as well as handle joystick, keyboard and mouse input.

Software architecture
GLFW is a small C library that allows the creation and management of windows with OpenGL contexts, making it also possible to use multiple monitors and video modes. It provides access to input from the keyboard, mouse, and joysticks. The API provides a thin, multi-platform abstraction layer, primarily for applications whose sole graphics output is through the OpenGL API. While GLFW is very useful when developing multi-platform OpenGL applications, single-platform developers can also benefit from avoiding having to deal with different platform-specific APIs. 

GLFW is used in programs that require a window, due to OpenGL not providing any mechanisms for creating the necessary contexts, managing windows, user input, timing, etc. There are several other libraries available for aiding OpenGL development. The most common ones are FreeGLUT (an Open Source implementation of GLUT) and SDL. However, FreeGLUT is mostly concerned with providing a stable clone of GLUT, while SDL is too large for some people and has never had OpenGL as its main focus. GLFW is predicated on the assumption that there is room for a lightweight, modern library for managing OpenGL contexts, windows, and input.

GLFW is not a user-interface library, platform-specific library, image-loading library or a threading library. Additionally, it cannot render independently or playback sound.

Programming language bindings
Although GLFW is written in C, bindings do exist to use the API with other programming languages including Ada, C#, Common Lisp, D, Delphi, Go, Harbour, Haskell, Java, Julia, Python, Rebol, Red, Ruby and Rust, among others.

Back-ends
GLFW version 3.2 has experimental support for Wayland through compile-time flags.

See also
 GLUT – OpenGL's legacy windowing toolkit
 OpenGL Extension Wrangler Library
 Raylib
 Simple DirectMedia Layer

References

External links
 
 

Application programming interfaces
C (programming language) libraries
Cross-platform software
Free software programmed in C
Linux APIs
macOS APIs
OpenGL
Software using the zlib license
Windows APIs